Lycomorphodes calopteridion is a moth of the family Erebidae. It was described by Joseph de Joannis in 1904. It is found in Brazil.

References

 

Cisthenina
Moths described in 1904